Roberto Gambino (born 15 February 1962 in Palermo) is an Italian architect and politician.

He ran for Mayor of Caltanissetta with the Five Star Movement at the 2019 Italian local elections and he was elected on 12 May. He took office on 15 May 2019.

See also
2019 Italian local elections
List of mayors of Caltanissetta

References

External links
 

1962 births
Living people
Mayors of Caltanissetta
Five Star Movement politicians